Marvel Graphic Novel (MGN) is a line of graphic novel trade paperbacks published from 1982 to 1993 by Marvel Comics. The books were published in an oversized format, 8.5" x 11", similar to French albums. In response, DC Comics established a competitor line known as DC Graphic Novel.

Publication history
The decision to launch the line was made in late 1979, after strong sales reports for the summer. Marvel editor-in-chief Jim Shooter envisioned the "books as being in the format of European albums, with cardboard covers, full-color, slick pages". In September 1980, Shooter indicated the line was delayed because of complications in putting together the contracts, which he was drafting in consultation with Marvel attorneys. In early 1981, Marvel hired Michael Z. Hobson away from Scholastic Books to be Vice-President/Publishing. His expertise in writing author contracts, which was greater than Shooter's, was a key reason. A few months later, contracts with writer/artist Jim Starlin were finalized for The Death of Captain Marvel and Dreadstar.

The Death of Captain Marvel, the first book in the line, was published in January 1982. Marvel numbered stories through 1985 up to number 20, but released many other stories in the same format that are considered unnumbered parts of the series according to the Official Overstreet Comic Book Price Guide. Overstreet continued numbering beyond the original "official" numbering, following a Marvel-published list of graphic novels. When the list stopped being published, Overstreet stopped trying to number the issues, halting at number 38, although they list 29 more issues published from 1983 through 1991, although the list is known not to include every graphic novel from this period.

The line was divided evenly between author-owned and company-owned titles. Several characters were featured in an issue of Marvel Graphic Novel before receiving their own miniseries or ongoing series. The most successful of these was The New Mutants, which ran for 100 issues. Other series which were spun-off from a Marvel Graphic Novel are Dreadstar, Void Indigo, Starstruck, and The Swords of the Swashbucklers. In addition, Star Slammers had a miniseries published by Malibu Comics and Futurians was a short-lived title published by Lodestone Comics.

List of graphic novels in the Marvel Graphic Novel line

Collected editions
 Essential Killraven includes Marvel Graphic Novel #7: Killraven: Warrior of the Worlds, 504 pages, July 2005, 
 Essential Dazzler Vol. 2 includes Marvel Graphic Novel #12: Dazzler: The Movie, 688 pages, April 2009, 
 Women of Marvel: Celebrating Seven Decades includes Marvel Graphic Novel #12: Dazzler: The Movie, #16: The Aladdin Effect, and #18: The Sensational She-Hulk, 1,160 pages, January 2011, 
 Spider-Man: The Graphic Novels collects Marvel Graphic Novel #22: The Amazing Spider-Man: Hooky, The Amazing Spider-Man: Parallel Lives, The Amazing Spider-Man: Spirits of the Earth, and Spider-Man: Fear Itself, 280 pages, June 2012,

Marvel Original Graphic Novel
In 2013, Marvel started publishing a new line of graphic novels titled Marvel Original Graphic Novel or Marvel OGN.

References

External links
 
The Definitive Graphic Novels List by Bob Rozakis (note: Rozakis uses a different numbering from Overstreet on MGN #32-35)

1982 comics debuts
Comics by Archie Goodwin (comics)
Comics by Chris Claremont
Comics by David Michelinie
Comics by Dennis O'Neil
Comics by Don McGregor
Comics by Doug Moench
Comics by Frank Miller (comics)
Comics by Gerry Conway
Comics by Howard Chaykin
Comics by Jim Starlin
Comics by J. M. DeMatteis
Comics by John Byrne (comics)
Comics by Roger Stern
Comics by Roy Thomas
Comics by Stan Lee
Comics by Steve Gerber
Comics by Walt Simonson
Comics by Warren Ellis
Defunct American comics
Marvel Comics graphic novels
Marvel Comics lines
Superhero comics